Chantal Beltman (born 25 August 1976 in Slagharen, Overijssel) is a former Dutch professional cyclist. She was part of the 2008  team. In 2007 this was called the T-Mobile Women cycling team. In 2006, Beltman raced for Vrienden van het Platteland team. She is the older sister of Ghita Beltman, who is a former cyclist.

Palmarès

1995
3rd Van Leuven Lady Trofee

1996
1st Omloop van het Ronostrand
1st Omloop van Ter Aar

1997
3rd Dutch National Time Trial Championships

1998
2nd Dutch National Road Race Championships
2nd Ster van Zeeland
1 stage Ster van Walcheren

1999
2nd Omloop van het Ronostrand
3rd Primavera Rosa
1 stage Tour de l'Aude Cycliste Féminin

2000
2nd Road Race, UCI Road World Championships
3rd Dutch National Road Race Championship
1st Lowland International Rotterdam Tour

2001
1 stage International Women's Challenge
1 stage Tour de Bretagne

2002
3rd Primavera Rosa
2nd Ronde van Drenthe
1 stage Giro d'Italia Femminile

2003
1 stage International Thüringen Rundfahrt der Frauen
1st Lowland International Rotterdam Tour

2004
2nd Tour de Féminin - Krasna Lipa
1 stage
1st Omloop van Borsele
2nd Dutch National Road Race Championships
1st Ster van Walcheren
1 stage Tour de l'Aude Cycliste Féminin

2005
3rd Ster Zeeuwsche Eilanden
1 stage

2006 (Vrienden van het Platteland 2006 season)
3rd Sparkassen Giro
1st Flèche Hesbignonne WE
2nd Omloop door Middag-Humsterland
1st Grote Prijs Gerrie Knetemann
1st Haspengouwse Pijl
1st stage 1 (Team Time Trial), Giro della Toscana Int. Femminile – Memorial Michela Fanini

2007
1st Open de Suède Vårgårda

2008
1st Ronde van Drenthe
1st Liberty Classic

2009  (Team Columbia-HTC 2009 season)

See also
 List of Dutch Olympic cyclists

External links
 

1976 births
Living people
Dutch female cyclists
Cyclists at the 2000 Summer Olympics
Cyclists at the 2008 Summer Olympics
Olympic cyclists of the Netherlands
People from Hardenberg
UCI Road World Championships cyclists for the Netherlands
Cyclists from Overijssel
20th-century Dutch women
20th-century Dutch people
21st-century Dutch women